Alysson Ramos da Silva or simply Alysson  (born March 6, 1978), is a Brazilian left back. He currently plays for Aparecidense.

Career
Alysson has played in Campeonato Brasileiro Série B with Atlético Clube Goianiense and Vila Nova Futebol Clube.

Honours
Minas Gerais State League: 2005
Bahia State League: 2007

Contract
ABC (Loan) 21 December 2007 to 30 November 2008
Vera Cruz 1 December 2005 to 1 December 2008

External links
Profile at Soccerway
 CBF
 websoccerclub
 abcfc.com.br

1978 births
Living people
Brazilian footballers
Fluminense de Feira Futebol Clube players
Esporte Clube São Bento players
Botafogo Futebol Clube (PB) players
Nacional Atlético Clube (Patos) players
Treze Futebol Clube players
Associação Atlética Caldense players
Ipatinga Futebol Clube players
Esporte Clube Vitória players
ABC Futebol Clube players
Atlético Clube Goianiense players
Vila Nova Futebol Clube players
Campinense Clube players
Association football defenders